Toxicology Mechanisms and Methods is a peer-reviewed medical journal covering research on all aspects of toxicology. The editor-in-chief is Rakesh Dixit. The journal is published 9 times per year by Informa. According to the Journal Citation Reports, the journal has a 2015 impact factor of 1.476.

References

External links 
 

Publications established in 2004
Toxicology journals
Taylor & Francis academic journals
English-language journals
9 times per year journals